Notius consputus is a species of bug belonging to the stink bug family (Pentatomidae), first described by Carl Stål in  1865. It is found in Queensland, New South Wales, and Tasmania.

References

External links
Notius consputus occurrence data from Atlas of Living Australia

Carpocorini
Notius consputus
Insects described in 1865
Taxa named by Carl Stål